The 1967 Arizona Wildcats football team represented the University of Arizona in the Western Athletic Conference (WAC) during the 1967 NCAA University Division football season.  In their first season under head coach Darrell Mudra, the Wildcats compiled a 3–6–1 record (1–4 against WAC opponents), finished in fourth place in the WAC, and were outscored by their opponents, 231 to 162.  The team played its home games in Arizona Stadium in Tucson, Arizona.

A major highlight of the season occurred in late September, when the Wildcats captured an upset win at Ohio State, which was one of the biggest wins for the program at the time.

The team's statistical leaders included Mark Reed with 759 passing yards, David Barajas with 337 rushing yards, and Roger Brautigan with 247 receiving yards.

Schedule

Season notes
 Arizona and Ohio State met for the first time. To date, this remains the Wildcats’ first and only win over the Buckeyes.
 In addition to playing Ohio State, the Wildcats played a second Big Ten team, Indiana. Arizona would ultimately lose to the Hoosiers.
 From mid-October to early November, Arizona played four consecutive home games, one of the earliest times in modern history that the Wildcats played four home or away games in a row in a season.

References

Arizona
Arizona Wildcats football seasons
Arizona Wildcats football